Gernot Trauner (born 25 March 1992) is an Austrian professional footballer who plays as a centre-back for Eredivisie club Feyenoord and the Austria national team.

Trauner progressed through different youth teams in Upper Austria, before making his debut in professional football as part of LASK in 2010. Sidelined by injury in the 2011–12 season, he made the move to SV Ried in 2012 where he made his breakthrough in the Austrian Bundesliga. He returned to LASK in 2017 under head coach Oliver Glasner where he grew into one of the best centre-backs in the league, and also experienced European success. In 2021, he joined Eredivisie club Feyenoord, where he reached the UEFA Europa Conference League final in his first season and was voted into the Team of the Season.

He made his debut for the Austria national team in 2018 in a friendly against Denmark.

Club career

Early years
Trauner started playing football for SV Kematen am Innbach in the Hausruckviertel of Upper Austria in 1997. Described by his youth coach Karl Karazi as "agile and techically gifted" from early on, he was particularly praised for his ambition to succeed. He progressed through the different youth teams of the club until 2006, where he moved to regional football academy of Linz. He played there from under-15 to the under-19 level, winning the national under-17 championship with the team in the 2008–09 season.

LASK
After having impressed with the under-19s of the Linz academy, Trauner was signed by regional powerhouse LASK in February 2010. He initially played for the second team competing in the Upper Austrian Landesliga. He made his debut for this team in a 6–1 victory against SV Gmunden on 21 March 2010, scoring a goal. Teammates on his debut included Lukas Kragl, Thomas Höltschl and Ali Hamdemir. In his first season he made another ten appearances and scored three more goals. The reserve team won promotion to the Austrian Regionalliga Central at the end of the season with a second place.

Ahead of the 2010–11 season, Trauner was promoted to the LASK first team, making his Austrian Bundesliga debut under head coach Helmut Kraft as a substitute for René Aufhauser in a 1–0 regional derby loss to SV Ried on 31 July 2010. He made 10 more league appearances that season as his team suffered relegation to the First League, but would miss the entirety of the 2011–12 season with a complicated hip injury.

SV Ried
Trauner joined SV Ried on 12 June 2012, after his contract with LASK had expired. He signed a three-year contract. He made his competitive debut for the club on 1 September, coming off the bench in the 84th minute for Nacho Rodríguez in a 1–0 home loss to Sturm Graz. 

He would suffer a zygomatic bone fracture in October 2013, again sidelining him for an extended period. However, he managed to establish himself as a starter for the club, switching from a position as central midfielder to centre-back under head coach Oliver Glasner. 

On 7 March 2015, Trauner scored his first goal in the Austrian Bundesliga, a powerful shot from distance, to hand Ried a 2–1 victory against SV Grödig. In May 2015, he signed a contract extension with Ried until 2017. 

Trauner suffered an anterior cruciate ligament injury in his right knee in April 2016, which meant that he missed large parts of the 2016–17 season. He returned to the pitch on 29 November 2016, after a six-month absence, coming on as a substitute in the second half for Clemens Walch in a 1–0 loss to Rheindorf Altach. The season ended with Ried suffering relegation to the second tier; their first relegation since 2003.

Return to LASK

On 29 May 2017, Trauner returned to LASK on a three-year contract, as the club had won promotion back to the Bundesliga. On 15 July, Trauner made his first competitive appearance for the club since his return, in the 1–0 win against FC Kitzbühel in the Austrian Cup. A week later he also played his first league game since his return, in a 3–0 victory against Admira Wacker. On 17 February 2018, Trauner scored his first goal for LASK, opening the score in a 2–0 win against Rheindorf Altach. The team finished fourth in the league table at the end of the season, and thus qualified for UEFA Europa League football. 

For the 2018–19 season, Trauner was named team captain. Entering the second qualifying round of the Europa League, Trauner made his European debut in a 4–0 victory against Norwegian club Lillestrøm. LASK were eliminated in the third qualifying round on away goals by Turkish side Beşiktaş. He finished the season with three goals scored as LASK finished in second place in the Bundesliga.

In the play-off round of the UEFA Champions League against Club Brugge, Trauner was sent off after receiving two yellow cards and LASK were eliminated, allowing them to enter the group stage of the Europa League. On 12 December 2019, Trauner scored his first European goal, opening the score against Sporting CP in a 3–0 win. In the Round of 16, LASK were eliminated by Manchester United. In the 2019–20 season, LASK finished in fourth place in the Bundesliga, a result they repeated in the 2020–21 season. In the latter season, they were eliminated in the group stage of the Europa League and lost the final of the Austrian Cup to Red Bull Salzburg.

Trauner made 158 competitive appearances for the club during his second stint, scoring 17 goals.

Feyenoord

Trauner joined Eredivisie club Feyenoord on 26 July 2021, for a reported fee of €1 million. He made his competitive debut for the club on 5 July, in a 3–0 away win against FC Luzern in the UEFA Europa Conference League. His home debut in the De Kuip followed in the return game a week later. On 15 August, Trauner made his Eredivisie debut in a 4–0 victory against Willem II. He held on to a place in the starting lineup throughout the season, as Feyenoord impressed in the first season under head coach Arne Slot, finishing third in the league table. Their main success, however, was in the UEFA Europa Conference League, where the club reached the final – the club's first European final since 2002. They were eventually beaten 1–0 in the final by José Mourinho's Roma. Trauner was voted into the Team of the Season of the inaugural tournament.

Following Jens Toornstra's departure, Feyenoord head coach Arne Slot chose Trauner as team captain for the league opener, a 5–2 win against Vitesse on 7 August 2022. His performance as captain was praised by pundit , who said he had "fought as a true captain" in RTV Rijnmond. In the end, long-time Feyenoord player Orkun Kökçü was made the new permanent club captain, with Trauner taking over duties as vice-captain. Trauner sustained a knee injury during practice on 22 December 2022 which required surgery, sidelining him for the following months.

International career
Trauner has represented Austria at under-18, under-19 and under-21 level and was a member of the Austrian squad at the 2010 UEFA European Under-19 Championship, where he played in all three of Austria's games and scored against England.

He made his debut for the Austria national football team on 16 October 2018 in a friendly against Denmark.

Personal life
Trauner is married and has three children.

Career statistics

Club

International

Scores and results list Austria's goal tally first, score column indicates score after each Trauner goal.

Honours
Feyenoord
 UEFA Europa Conference League runner-up: 2021–22

Individual
Austrian Bundesliga Team of the Year: 2018–19 2019–20
 UEFA Europa Conference League Team of the Season: 2021–22

References

External links

1992 births
Living people
Association football midfielders
Austrian footballers
Austria youth international footballers
Austria under-21 international footballers
Austria international footballers
Austrian Football Bundesliga players
Eredivisie players
LASK players
SV Ried players
Feyenoord players
Austrian expatriate footballers
Expatriate footballers in the Netherlands
Footballers from Linz